The Affric / Beauly hydro-electric power scheme for the generation of hydro-electric power is located in the western Highlands of Scotland. It is based around  Glen Strathfarrar, Glen Cannich and Glen Affric, and Strathglass further downstream.

The scheme was developed by the North of Scotland Hydro-Electric Board, with plans being approved in 1947.

The largest dam of the scheme is at Loch Mullardoch, at the head of Glen Cannich. From there, a tunnel takes water to Loch Beinn a' Mheadhoinn (Loch Benevean) in Glen Affric,  via a small underground power station near Mullardoch dam. Loch Benevean is also dammed, with a tunnel taking water to the main power station of Fasnakyle, near Cannich. 

To the north in Glen Strathfarrar, Loch Monar is dammed, and a  tunnel carries water to an underground power station at Deanie. Further down the glen, the River Farrar is dammed just below Loch Beannacharan, with a tunnel to take water to Culligran power station, which is also underground.

The River Farrar joins with the River Glass near Struy to form the River Beauly. Downstream on the River Beauly, dams and power stations have been built in gorges at Aigas and Kilmorack.

As the rivers in this scheme are important for Atlantic salmon, flow in the rivers is kept above agreed levels. The dams at Kilmorack, Aigas and Beannacharn contain Borland fish lifts to allow salmon to pass.

Today the scheme is owned and run by Scottish and Southern Energy, having previously  been owned by Scottish Hydro Electric until the electricity industry was privatised.

Power stations

References

Buildings and structures in Highland (council area)
Hydroelectric power stations in Scotland
Underground power stations